MTL Blog is a Montreal-based Digital Publisher founded in 2012 by Charles Lapointe and Joshua McRae and owned by Narcity Media. The site features local, provincial, and Canadian news and stories, and showcases activities to do in and around the city of Montreal.

History
MTLBlog.com was initially launched in 2012 by Chuck Lapointe and Joshua McRae as a website focused on nightlife photography and parties in Montreal.

In 2013, the website incorporated into MTL Blog Inc. and started creating more content in style of listicles that were local, and some more generic. MTL Blog's first office was located in Montreal, Quebec on Saint Laurent Boulevard. 

In 2014 and 2015, the blog's popularity flourished by creating more provocative content and focusing on local listicles.

Controversy
Between 2013 and 2014, the blog a was accused of "everything from stealing their content to sensationalizing the news to getting basic facts wrong in their reporting." MTL Blog was notably criticized for accepting money in exchange for content. As a result, a number of mock websites had appeared as well as the #stopmtlblog movement on social media. Most of the spoof websites were taken down on the count of trademark and copyright infringements.

In 2015, writer Irina Tee wrote multiple provocative articles about relationships and dating. Tee was criticised for allegedly supporting misogyny. She became the subject of multiple petitions and an open-letter demanding her suspension from her writing position at MTL Blog was posted on The Link, thus creating controversy for the website.

References

External links 
 

Canadian news websites
English-language mass media in Quebec
Internet properties established in 2012
Mass media in Montreal
2012 establishments in Quebec